The Arkansas Razorbacks football program represents the University of Arkansas in the sport of American football.  The Razorbacks compete in the Football Bowl Subdivision (FBS) of the National Collegiate Athletic Association (NCAA) and the Western Division of the Southeastern Conference (SEC). The program has one national championship awarded by the Football Writers Association of America (FWAA) and Helms Athletic Foundation (HAF) in 1964, and one national championship awarded by the Rothman Foundation for the Analysis of Competitions and Tournaments (Rothman (FACT)) in 1977. The school does not claim the 1977 title. Arkansas has won 13 conference championships, includes 58 All-Americans amongst its list of players, and holds an all-time record of 736–531–40. Home games are played at stadiums on or near the two largest campuses of the University of Arkansas System: Donald W. Reynolds Razorback Stadium in Fayetteville, and War Memorial Stadium in Little Rock.

History

Early history (1894–1957) 

The first University of Arkansas football team was formed in 1894 and coached by John Futrall, who was a Latin professor at the university. That team played three games: two against Fort Smith High School and one against Texas. Before the 1909 season, the teams were called the Arkansas Cardinals and a bird was the school's mascot. The name and mascot changed following the 1909 season when the football team, coached by Hugo Bezdek, finished 7–0. The Cardinals became the Razorbacks after Arkansas defeated LSU 7–0, and coach Bezdek told a group of reporters after the game that his team played like a "wild band of Razorback hogs". The name stuck, and the student body voted to change the mascot. The "Wooo Pig Sooie" or "Calling The Hogs" became a tradition and the official school cheer in the 1920s when farmers rushing out to meet the bus returning from an away game called the hogs as a greeting. Arkansas prevailed over powerhouses Oklahoma, LSU and Washington University in St. Louis in 1909, and was declared unofficial champions of the South and Southwest. It was with the help of Steve Creekmore that this was accomplished. Creekmore became perhaps the first Razorback star, a quarterback from Van Buren who initially played only intramurals. Bezdek used Creekmore to install a very early edition of the hurry-up offense, as the team never huddled and chased the ball after every play. Creekmore was also known for "fast and slippery running, blocking, and passing" and could also return punts and tackle well.

There are differing stories about the origins of the 'Razorbacks' mascot, however. The Texarkana Arkansas High School mascot and athletic emblem is the Razorback with red and white serving as the school colors. The Razorback mascot was selected in 1910 to replace the Cardinal as the University of Arkansas mascot. In exchange for its use, the university provided used athletic gear to Texarkana Arkansas High; this practice is no longer used. With the new name and mascot, the Hogs defeated LSU 51–0 and gave Texas A&M their only loss in 1910, but fell short of another perfect season, losing 5–0 to Kansas State. In 1913, Arkansas quarterback J. L. Carter and the Razorbacks lost to Ole Miss, and took a fateful train to Arkadelphia to play Ouachita Baptist. While Carter was eating, he was invited to a meeting of Ouachita boosters. He transferred (which took place immediately, this being permissible at the time) and defeated Arkansas 15–9 in 1914. The Hogs would be contacted by L. Theo Bellmont in 1913 in his attempt to create an intercollegiate conference to regulate use of ringers. Hugo Bezdek, since replaced by E. T. Pickering, had recommended that the Hogs join a conference before he left to coach at Oregon.

The Razorbacks joined the Southwest Conference (SWC) as charter members in 1915. The conference also included teams from Texas (Baylor, Rice, Texas, Texas A&M) and Oklahoma (Oklahoma, Oklahoma A&M). Southwestern (TX) would also join, but leave the following year. The 1916, 1917, and 1919 teams were led at quarterback by "Arkansas' greatest athlete" Gene Davidson. The Razorbacks didn't have a winning conference record until 1920, and didn't win the conference championship until 1936. Arkansas had the best record during the 1933 season, but had to forfeit the SWC Championship because Ulysses "Heine" Schleuter, who had no eligibility remaining, played on the team. Schleuter had told coach Fred Thomsen that he was eligible, but he was recognized by an SMU player during the game as a former Cornhusker. The Hogs did accept an invitation to the 1934 Dixie Classic, a precursor to today's Cotton Bowl Classic. Arkansas became rivals with Ole Miss due to proximity. Although not SWC members, Ole Miss played Arkansas intermittently until a yearly series began from 1952–1961. During the 1938 season, the Razorbacks replaced their 300-seat stadium known as The Hill with Bailey Stadium, named after Arkansas governor Carl Bailey. It was known as University Stadium for one game before being changed to honor the governor. This stadium still exists today, although heavily renovated, as Donald W. Reynolds Razorback Stadium, the current home of the Razorbacks.

Arkansas won the conference championship in 1946, earning a bid in the 1947 Cotton Bowl Classic with LSU. The game would become known as the Ice Bowl, as a winter storm hit Dallas before the game. The two rivals battled to a scoreless tie, with Razorback great Clyde Scott tackling an LSU Tiger at the one yard-line to preserve the tie on the second-to-last play of the game. LSU would fail to complete the field goal attempt on the next play. The Razorbacks defeated William & Mary the next year in the 1948 Dixie Bowl. In 1954, the Ole Miss rivalry would catch fire. The Hogs played the Rebels in War Memorial Stadium on October 23, 1954. The Rebels were ranked No. 5 by the AP Poll entering the game, and Arkansas was picked to finish last in the SWC. The contest would be decided by a 66-yard halfback pass from tailback Buddy Bob Benson to blocking back Preston Carpenter, the only score of the game. This is referred to as the Powder River Play, and "perhaps the most important in Arkansas football history to that time" by Orville Henry, a member of the 1954 team. The Hogs would get back to the Cotton Bowl Classic in 1954, only to be defeated by Georgia Tech. Future Arkansas head coach Frank Broyles was an assistant under Yellowjackets head coach Bobby Dodd in the game. The 1954 season was all the more impressive when it is considered that the team only had twenty-five players on the squad. That team, dubbed the "25 Little Pigs" and coached by Bowden Wyatt, finished 8-3 and won the Southwest Conference championship. During this period, Arkansas developed rivalries with Texas and Texas A&M because of their intense conference match-ups.

Frank Broyles era (1958–1976) 

Missouri head coach Frank Broyles was hired as the Razorbacks head football coach in 1957 and served in that position for 19 years. Arkansas would grow into a national power with Broyles at the helm, including several conference championships and a national title. Arkansas would earn a share of the 1959 SWC Championship, splitting with Texas. Arkansas lost only to No. 3 Texas and No. 6 Ole Miss during the season. The Hogs went to Jacksonville and defeated Georgia Tech in the 1960 Gator Bowl 14–7, avenging an earlier Cotton Bowl Classic defeat. Barry Switzer was a co-captain on the team. Some, including University Chancellor and student during 1958, John White, view the Razorback football team during this period as a revival of Arkansas, which was recovering from the Little Rock Nine and racial segregation problems.

The 1960s was the best decade in Arkansas football history. 1960 brought another SWC crown, and a Cotton Bowl Classic invitation for the Hogs, who were ranked as high as 7th during the season. The Razorbacks lost to No. 2 Ole Miss and No. 20 Baylor, but defeated No. 11 Texas in Austin, bringing the championship to Fayetteville. The Hogs lost to Duke, 7–6, because of a blocked extra point. The following season brought another shared SWC championship with Texas. The Hogs were defeated by the Longhorns 33–7, as well as the No. 9 Ole Miss Rebels, warranting an invitation to New Orleans, Louisiana, for the Sugar Bowl. No. 1 Alabama defeated the Razorbacks 10–3. The Crimson Tide had been declared National Champions before the game, which was the procedure at the time. The Hogs would fight this system in 1964, when the same Alabama team would claim the 1964 AP crown before losing the Orange Bowl to the Texas Longhorns, a team Arkansas defeated in Austin, Texas, during the regular season. Arkansas won the Cotton Bowl Classic over Nebraska, 10–7.

Broyles' team was awarded the 1964 National Championship by the Football Writers Association of America and the Helms Athletic Foundation. The FWAA and HAF awarded their National Championships to Arkansas, who was the only team to go undefeated through the bowl games that year. At the time, the Associated Press (AP) and UPI awarded their national titles before the bowl games, and gave their trophies to the Alabama team that would lose in the Orange Bowl game a few days later. The next season, 1965, the Razorbacks were 10–0 in the regular season, and were once again the Southwest Conference Champions. That sent the Razorbacks back to the Cotton Bowl Classic on New Year's Day, this time to play against LSU. Because of the controversy in determining the national champions in 1964, the AP poll would wait until after the bowl games to announce its champion. With top-ranked Michigan State losing in the Rose Bowl, the No. 2 Razorbacks had a chance to become national champions, but were defeated 14–7 by the Tigers.

Arkansas would return to the field in 1966 ranked fifth, but losses against unranked Baylor and Texas Tech would prevent the 8–2 Hogs from playing in a bowl game. Loyd Phillips was a consensus All-American defensive tackle on the team. Phillips also took home the Outland Trophy. After struggling to a 4–5–1 record in 1967, the Hogs went 10–1 and returned to the postseason in 1968. No. 9 Arkansas defeated No. 2 Georgia in the Sugar Bowl, 16–2. Sophomore receiver Chuck Dicus scored the only touchdown of the game for the Razorbacks. In 1969, the Razorbacks had another chance to claim the national title, when No. 2 Arkansas played the No. 1 Texas Longhorns, coached by Darrell Royal, at Razorback Stadium in Fayetteville, Arkansas. The game, known as "The Big Shootout" or the Game of the Century, is perhaps the most notable football game in Razorbacks history. Arkansas led 14–0 at after three quarters, but Texas stormed back and took a 15–14 lead on a two-point conversion, after a questionable passing play was called late in the game by then coach Frank Broyles, which was intercepted by Texas. President Richard Nixon was in attendance, and proclaimed Texas the national champions, even though they had a bowl game to play, and Penn State was also undefeated. Arkansas lost to Ole Miss in the Sugar Bowl, 27–22, and Texas beat Notre Dame in the Cotton Bowl Classic for the national title.

The 1970s brought more success for Broyles, led by Razorback standouts Chuck Dicus and Ben Cowins. The 1970 Razorbacks would go 9–2, with the nine consecutive wins bookended by losses in the opener to No. 10 Stanford and the finale to No. 1 Texas. The 1971 Razorbacks went 8–3–1, including upset wins over No. 7 Cal and No. 10 Texas. They were invited to the Liberty Bowl, but lost to No. 9 Tennessee 14–13. The 1972–1974 seasons would be mediocre, as Arkansas struggled to defeat the Texas teams. The Hogs went 11–8–2 against schools in Texas, but failed to beat the University of Texas during the span. The highlight of the period was an upset of No. 5 USC in War Memorial Stadium in 1974. Broyles would win his seventh and final Southwest Conference championship in 1975. The contest with Texas A&M was moved until the end of the year, as it was expected to decide the Southwest Conference championship. The Razorbacks did not disappoint, as Arkansas defeated No. 2 Texas A&M, 31–6, in War Memorial Stadium. The win forced the Aggies to share the conference championship with Texas and Arkansas. However, the tie-breaker went to Arkansas, thus Arkansas received the invitation to the Cotton Bowl Classic. The Cotton Bowl Classic berth would also be Broyles' last appearance. Arkansas would fall behind Georgia early on in that game, but came roaring back to beat the Bulldogs easily, 31–10. Arkansas finished with a 10–2 record and finished ranked No. 7 in the AP and No. 6 in the UPI that season. Broyles coached the Razorbacks in 1976, but with limited success, compiling a 5–5–1 record. Broyles retired as Arkansas head coach following the 1976 season, but served as the university's athletics director until December 31, 2007. He is now arguably one of the best college football coaches to coach Arkansas.

Lou Holtz era (1977–1983) 

After Broyles left coaching and became athletic director at Arkansas, he hired New York Jets head coach Lou Holtz to take his former position. Holtz served as head football coach from 1977 through the 1983 season.

Holtz led the Razorbacks through a 10–1 regular season in 1977, losing only to No. 2 Texas. The No. 6 Hogs were invited to play in the Orange Bowl against No. 2 Oklahoma. The Sooners had a chance to become national champions with a win over the shorthanded Razorbacks, who had suffered a season-long rash of injuries and player suspensions. Prior to Christmas, the university announced that star running back Ben Cowins, leading receiver Donny Bobo, and back-up running back Michael Forrest would all be sent back to Fayetteville. Following the suspensions, numerous African-American players on the team threatened to boycott the game. The always-quotable Holtz said two days before the game, "I'm one step short of suicide". The Razorbacks found an unlikely hero in Roland Sales, who rushed for 205 yards on 23 carries and two scores. Sales also led the Hogs in receiving in the contest. In addition, Holtz used third-string running back Randy Richey, who added 98 rushing yards and a touchdown on only 5 carries. The Hogs ended the Sooners' hope with a 31–6 victory. This game is notable as one of the biggest upsets in Razorback football history. Ironically, University of Arkansas alumnus Barry Switzer coached the Sooners in the contest, and late in the game, future Arkansas head coach Houston Nutt played quarterback for Holtz. Arkansas finished the season 11-1 and was selected as a co-national champion for the 1977 season by the Rothman Foundation for the Analysis of Competitions and Tournaments (Rothman (FACT)), along with Notre Dame and Texas, but the university does not claim this title.

In 1978, the Razorbacks went 9–2 during the regular season, losing back-to-back games at No. 8 Texas and No. 11 Houston. A 49–7 win over No. 16 Texas A&M did give the Hogs a Fiesta Bowl berth, but the Razorbacks and UCLA Bruins would battle to a 10–10 tie, as the Razorbacks finished 9-2-1. In 1979, Holtz's Razorbacks won a share of the Southwest Conference (sharing with Houston). The 10–2 Hogs defeated nemesis No. 2 Texas in Little Rock, but lost an outright conference title to No. 6 Houston in Fayetteville. Earning a bid to the Sugar Bowl, the No. 6 Hogs were set to play No. 2 Alabama with a chance at the national championship. Instead, Alabama defeated the Razorbacks 24–9, winning their sixth claimed national title. The Razorbacks would continue to succeed under Holtz, winning the 1980 Hall of Fame Classic following the 1980 regular season and defeating No. 1 Texas by a score of 42–11 in 1981. Despite winning the 1982 Bluebonnet Bowl over the Florida Gators and finishing 9–2–1 in 1982, a 6–5 season in 1983 would be the end of the Holtz era.

At the time, athletic director Frank Broyles stated that Holtz had resigned and was not fired, but two decades later Broyles acknowledged that Holtz was indeed fired because his actions were negatively affecting the fan base. Holtz would subsequently be hired by Minnesota. Reports also cited his political involvement as a major reason for his firing: controversy arose over his having taped two television advertisements from his coach's office endorsing the re-election of Jesse Helms as Senator from North Carolina at a time when Helms was leading the effort to block Martin Luther King Day from becoming a national holiday. Holtz left the program with a mark of 60–21–2. His teams reached six consecutive bowls (1977–1982), but only won one split conference championship. Holtz used a very conservative option offense.

Ken Hatfield era (1984–1989) 
Ken Hatfield replaced Holtz in 1984. Hatfield played defensive back for Broyles on the 1964 national championship team, and was an All-American punt returner. It was Hatfield's punt return for a touchdown that beat No. 1 Texas in Austin in 1964 that propelled that team to finish undefeated.

Hatfield finished his six-year tenure at Arkansas with a record of 55–17–1 and won back-to-back Southwest Conference titles in 1988 and 1989, Hatfield's last two years, and to date the Razorbacks' most recent conference championships. Hatfield would win seventy-six percent of his games at Arkansas, which is still a record today. He coached three teams to ten-win seasons in 1985, 1988, and 1989, and his 1986 and 1987 teams won nine games. But Hatfield was not successful in bowl games, only winning one (1985 Holiday Bowl) out of six. Hatfield was also criticized for being too conservative in the play-calling of his flexbone offense, with many fans noting that the team only threw three passes the entire game in a 16–14 loss to Texas in 1987, when the Longhorns scored a touchdown on the last play of the game to upset Arkansas. The Hatfield-led Razorbacks also lost to Texas in 1985 by a score of 15–13, when the Texas placekicker successfully made all five of his field goal attempts, but the Arkansas kicker missed two of four attempts. Hatfield would switch to the option-I formation prior to the 1989 season. Hatfield was also criticized for finishing with a losing record against Texas, going 2–4, with both victories on the road in Austin, Texas.

Despite this success, Hatfield had a somewhat frosty relationship with Broyles, and lost out on several key recruits when other coaches spread rumors that he was in Broyles' doghouse.  When Broyles signed a new five-year contract as athletic director, Hatfield abruptly resigned less than two weeks after losing the 1990 Cotton Bowl Classic with a ten-win team to accept the head coaching post at Clemson without ever visiting the Clemson campus before taking the job. Hatfield would go on to coach Clemson for four years, winning two bowl games and an ACC championship in 1991, before leaving to coach the Rice Owls for twelve seasons and winning a share of the SWC championship in 1994.

During this period, Broyles engineered Arkansas' move from the Southwest Conference to the Southeastern Conference (SEC), effective with the 1992 season.

Jack Crowe era (1990–1992) 

When Hatfield announced he was leaving for Clemson, Broyles was in a difficult situation. Not only was there nowhere near enough time to find a big-name coach, but National Signing Day was only three weeks away. Broyles persuaded Jack Crowe, who had just come to Fayetteville as offensive coordinator, to drop his initial plans to follow Hatfield to Clemson and take over as head coach of the Razorbacks. The decision came as something of a surprise, since Crowe had only won five games in two seasons at Livingston University in the late 1970s. By the start of the season, the Razorbacks had seen Barry Foster give up his senior season to enter the 1990 NFL Draft and had lost numerous other players to disciplinary and academic problems. Under the circumstances, the Razorbacks struggled to a 3–8 record–their first losing season since 1967, and only their fifth sub-.500 record since the 1950s. They barely qualified for a bowl in 1991.

The Razorbacks opened the 1992 season—their first in the Southeastern Conference—with an upset loss to a Division I-AA team, The Citadel. The next day, Broyles announced that Crowe had resigned and that defensive coordinator Joe Kines would coach the Razorbacks for the rest of the season.  However, Crowe's lawyer subsequently told Sports Illustrated that Crowe had been fired, and Broyles admitted that he'd fired Crowe due to concern that the fans no longer had confidence in him.  He finished 9–15 in two seasons and one game in Fayetteville.

Danny Ford era (1993–1997) 
Joe Kines brought Danny Ford to Arkansas in 1992 to help with the clean-up following Frank Broyles' firing of Jack Crowe (Ford's former offensive coordinator at Clemson) after a loss to the Citadel. This immediately led to speculation that Ford would be named head coach on a permanent basis.  The speculation bore fruit after the season, when Ford was named head coach. He led Arkansas to an SEC West championship in 1995 on the legs of Madre Hill and the defensive genius of Joe Lee Dunn, after emerging from two years under Crowe. However, this was one of only two winning seasons the Razorbacks notched in Ford's tenure. Broyles fired Ford following back-to-back 4–7 campaigns. Ford finished 26–30–1 in five seasons with the Razorbacks.

It was ironic that Ford ended up at Arkansas, since his replacement at Clemson was former Razorback head coach Ken Hatfield, who had had his own falling out with Arkansas athletic director Frank Broyles. Hatfield took the Clemson job in January 1990, less than a week after Ford resigned, without even visiting the campus.

Ford proved to be a solid recruiter, as his replacement at Arkansas, Houston Nutt, went on to win 17 games in the 1998 (9-3) and 1999 (8-4) seasons combined, to include a 1998 SEC West co-championship and a Cotton Bowl championship on January 1, 2000, with a victory over Texas. Both of those squads included players Ford had recruited to Arkansas.

Houston Nutt era (1998–2007) 

On December 10, 1997, Boise State head coach Houston Nutt was hired by the University of Arkansas to succeed Danny Ford. Upon his arrival at Arkansas, Nutt invigorated the Hog fan base with his enthusiasm and high energy. 

Under Nutt, the Razorbacks were one of three SEC schools to play in three New Year's Day bowls within five years. Nutt's teams were noted for a series of overtime games, including the two longest overtime games in NCAA history. Off the field, some of Nutt's players were named to the SEC Academic Honor Roll 145 times and he has established a reputation as a responsible coach academically. 

Nutt received some criticism for a SEC win–loss record that was just barely over .500 and because he calls his own offensive plays during a game instead of relying on an offensive coordinator. In his first six seasons, Nutt led the team to a bowl game each year and averaged eight wins per season.

1998 Season
Nutt's Razorbacks were picked to finish last in the Southeastern Conference Western Division in 1998 but ended up with a 9–3 record and a share of the division title. The Razorbacks lost to the eventual national champion Tennessee Volunteers on Tennessee's home field after quarterback Clint Stoerner fumbled while trying to run out the clock. 

For their efforts, the Razorbacks received their first-ever invitation to the Citrus Bowl and ended the season ranked No. 16 after losing to Michigan. Nutt was selected as the Football News' National Coach of the Year.

1999 Season
In 1999, Nutt's Razorbacks were picked to win the SEC Western Division, but suffered a series of setbacks during the season. They recovered to defeat nationally ranked Tennessee and Mississippi State to earn a Cotton Bowl Classic bid versus arch-rival Texas. 

The Razorbacks defeated Texas 27–6, becoming the first team to ever hold Texas to negative rushing yards in a game. The Cotton Bowl victory propelled Arkansas into the top 20 to end the season.

2000 Season
The 2000 season saw the Razorbacks lose the core of their team and suffer a string of injuries, including season-ending injuries to all of the starting running backs. The Razorbacks struggled throughout the season until the final two games when they defeated ranked Mississippi State and LSU teams to pull out another winning record and a Las Vegas Bowl appearance.

2001 Season
In the 2001 season, the Razorbacks started off with three straight losses in SEC play. 

On November 3, 2001, Arkansas defeated Ole Miss 58-56 in 7 overtimes, a record for the longest college football game at the time. The Rebels, led by freshman quarterback Eli Manning, took their second loss of the 2001 season after failing to complete a 4-yard Two-point conversion in the seventh OT period. "It was gladiator-like," Nutt said after the game. "TD after TD. Two points after two points."

They then came back to win six of the last seven including victories over ranked South Carolina and Auburn teams. 

Based on this performance, the Razorbacks were selected to return to the Cotton Bowl Classic to face the defending national champion Oklahoma Sooners.  Arkansas lost, gaining only 50 yards of total offense and just six first downs. Nutt was named SEC coach of the year by the Associated Press and by the SEC coaches.

2002 Season
In 2002, Nutt's Razorbacks stumbled midway through the season but pulled together five straight wins, including a last second touchdown pass against LSU, often referred to as the "Miracle on Markham" to pull out a share of a Western Division title. Arkansas was defeated by the Georgia Bulldogs in the SEC Championship Game and ended the season with a loss to Minnesota in the Music City Bowl.

2003 Season
In 2003, Nutt's team started off with a 4–0 record including a win against No. 5 Texas on their home field. The early season success raised fan expectations sky-high and put Nutt under intense pressure when the Razorbacks lost their next three games, putting them out of contention for the national championship or even the SEC Western Division crown. 

The Razorbacks won four of their final five games and defeated Missouri in the Independence Bowl. After the 2003 season, Nebraska was rumored to be courting Nutt to be their head coach, after the firing of Frank Solich.

2004 Season
The 2004 and 2005 campaigns were widely expected to be rebuilding years due to young teams.  The 2004 season ended with a 5–6 record and without a bowl invitation for the first time under Nutt.

2005 Season
The 2005 season was also a rebuilding year as expected. 

Tough losses to USC (70–17) as well as to Vanderbilt and South Carolina showed that the season had been predicted accurately. The team was ineligible for a bowl for the second season in a row (and the second season overall under coach Nutt). This led to Razorback fans calling for coaching changes. 

After meeting with Frank Broyles (athletic director) at the conclusion of the season, coaching changes were made by Nutt in the offseason at the risk of being fired, the most notable of which was the forced addition of Gus Malzahn, previously the head coach at Springdale High School in Springdale, Arkansas, as offensive coordinator.  

The hiring of Malzahn allowed Nutt to sign several highly recruited Springdale players, including Springdale High School quarterback Mitch Mustain and wide receiver Damian Williams who eventually transferred to USC.

2006 Season
The 2006 season began with a new offensive coordinator in Malzahn. The Razorbacks started the season losing 50–14, at a home game in Fayetteville, to USC. Following the loss to the Trojans, Nutt announced that Mustain would replace Robert Johnson as the Hogs' starting quarterback.  

Mustain led Arkansas to eight straight wins, including wins against No. 22 Alabama at home and No. 2 Auburn at Auburn, before losing the starting job to Casey Dick. Dick had been slotted to start at the beginning of the season but was unable to do so due to a back injury suffered in the spring. 

Dick led the Razorbacks to two victories out of four for a total of 10 wins, including a win over No. 13 Tennessee. The Razorbacks moved to No. 7 in the BCS standings. However, the Hogs lost their last regular season game to the No. 8 LSU Tigers, 31–26. Despite the loss, the Hogs were still Western Division Champions of the SEC, and played the 11–1, fourth-ranked Florida Gators for the SEC Championship. Florida won, 38–28.  

The Razorbacks then lost to the No. 5 Wisconsin Badgers on New Year's Day, 2007 in the Capital One Bowl. A highlight of the season was the second-place finish of sophomore tailback Darren McFadden in the Heisman Trophy voting. 

Nutt was named SEC coach of the year by the Associated Press and by the SEC coaches for the second time. The Razorbacks finished the season at 10–4.

2007 Season
The 2007 season began with the Razorbacks ranked No. 21 by the AP Poll. The Hogs opened at home with a victory over Troy. However, early losses to Alabama and Kentucky knocked Arkansas out of the rankings and made the remaining SEC schedule an uphill struggle, even with Darren McFadden, Felix Jones, and Peyton Hillis in the Razorback backfield. 

Fan frustration boiled over to some fans wearing all black T-shirts with anti-Nutt statements and buying an entire page in a local Little Rock newspaper calling for Nutt to be fired. A non-official flyover was made hours before the Auburn home game with a small airplane holding a banner, which read: "Fire Houston Nutt. Players and fans deserve better." 

On November 23, 2007, in Baton Rouge, Nutt's Razorbacks beat the top-ranked football team in the nation on the road. In a game that lasted three overtimes, Arkansas defeated eventual national champion LSU Tigers, 50–48, returning the Golden Boot back to Arkansas. Arkansas finished the season with an 8–5 record.

Resignation
Three days later, Nutt resigned as head coach of the Arkansas Razorbacks amid several controversies and rumors, which had come prior to and throughout the 2007 season.  He left the school with a 75–48 record, which is second on the school's all-time win list, behind only Frank Broyles.

Bobby Petrino era (2008–2011) 

On December 11, 2007, former Louisville head coach Bobby Petrino came to Arkansas from the NFL's Atlanta Falcons to become the Razorbacks' 31st head coach. Petrino was regarded as an up-and-coming college coach who, despite his failed 11-month stint with the Falcons, had led Louisville to 41 wins in 50 games and was regarded as one of the nation's brilliant offensive minds, employing a spread hybrid offense. 

Hired by newly hired athletics director Jeff Long, Petrino signed a five-year contract worth $2.85 million per year with the university administration.

2008 Season
The 2008 season was expected to be a transition year for the team and Petrino. Though eliminated from bowl contention, Petrino led the Razorbacks to a last-second victory over rival and defending national champions LSU (nicknamed the Miracle on Markham II) to finish the season 5–7 and a conference mark of 2–6.

2009 Season
Petrino's 2009 Razorbacks made dramatic improvement. Led by Michigan transfer Ryan Mallett at quarterback, the Razorbacks nearly defeated the Tim Tebow-led Florida Gators, who were ranked No. 1 in the country at that time, in Gainesville, Florida. 

The Hogs went on to win the 2010 Liberty Bowl against East Carolina and finish with a record of 8–5.

2010 Season
The 2010 Arkansas Razorbacks improved on their 2009 record and won 6 in a row to end the year after earlier losses to Alabama and Auburn. Arkansas finished the season 10–2 overall and earned a BCS bowl berth, the first in Arkansas history. 

The Razorbacks lost the Sugar Bowl in New Orleans against the sixth ranked Ohio State Buckeyes by a score of 31–26. Though the result was later vacated by the NCAA as a result of sanctions against Ohio State, the game was the first game ever played between the two teams. 

Under Petrino's tutelage, quarterback Ryan Mallett broke numerous school passing records in 2010 as well. On December 11, 2010, Petrino received a seven-year contract extension from the University of Arkansas administration.

2011 Season
In 2011, the reins were handed to Tyler Wilson after Mallett went to the NFL. Wilson picked up where Mallett left off, and Arkansas spent more than half the season ranked in the top ten. 

After beating Kansas State in the Cotton Bowl Classic by a score of 29–16, the Razorbacks finished with an 11–2 record and a No. 5 final ranking in the AP poll, the school's highest ranking since 1977. 

The eleven wins also tied a school record. The only two teams to beat the Hogs that year were Bama and LSU, the two teams that played each other for the national championship.

Petrino Investigated and Fired
On April 1, 2012, Petrino was involved in a single-vehicle motorcycle crash in rural Madison County, near Crosses. After initially stating publicly that he was alone, both in a written press release and during a press conference, it was discovered in the police report of the accident that Petrino had been riding with a passenger, former Arkansas All-SEC volleyball player Jessica Dorrell. 

In his acknowledgement of the report, Petrino admitted to having engaged in a "previous inappropriate relationship" with Dorrell. As a result of this information, athletics director Jeff Long placed Petrino on paid administrative leave, pending an investigation. 

On April 10, 2012, after his investigation, Long announced that he had fired Petrino with cause, saying that Petrino "engaged in a pattern of misleading and manipulative behavior designed to deceive me and members of the athletic staff, both before and after the motorcycle accident." 

He also revealed that in addition to his previously undisclosed personal relationship, Petrino had secretly paid Dorrell $20,000 and had used his influence to ensure that she was selected from an applicant pool of 159 people for a position on the football coaching staff. Long believed the payment could expose Arkansas to a sexual harassment suit if Petrino were retained. 

Petrino left Arkansas with a 34–17 record.

John L. Smith era (2012) 
On April 23, 2012, Petrino's coaching mentor, John L. Smith, was announced as Arkansas' 32nd head football coach. 

Smith signed a 10-month contract worth $850,000. While the length of the contract made it appear that Smith was merely an interim hire, Arkansas' official announcement described Smith as "head coach," without any qualifier. 

School officials did announce that the 10-month contract would give them a chance to "identify a head coach for the future of the program." Smith's hiring was ironic, as Petrino had succeeded Smith as head coach at Louisville. Just four months earlier, Smith had accepted the head coaching position at his alma mater Weber State after serving under Petrino as special teams coordinator for the Razorbacks.

Smith's hiring was met both with approval and some controversy.  A significant number of current players expressed their strong approval for the Smith hire.  However, some critics, such as argued that he had abandoned his previous post at Weber State after only  months. 

For instance, ESPN's Gene Wojciechowski claimed Smith was merely "leasing himself to the Razorbacks for a year."

2012 Season
The Razorbacks struggled to a 4–8 record in 2012 despite starting the season with high expectations and being ranked in the Top 10 nationally. 

Smith was not retained after the season.

Bret Bielema era (2013–2017) 

On December 4, 2012, it was announced that Bret Bielema would leave the Wisconsin Badgers to become the 33rd head coach in Arkansas history.

2013 Season
Bielema's first season at Arkansas resulted in an overall record of 3–9, 0–8 in the SEC. It was the Razorbacks' worst SEC mark since entering the league in 1992 and their first winless in-conference season since 1942, when they were a member of the Southwest Conference.

2014 Season
Bieleam's second season saw him improve on his first, as Arkansas finished 7–6. Bielema won his first two SEC games in dominating fashion in November, beating No. 17 LSU 17–0 on November 15, 2014 and No. 8 Ole Miss 30–0 on November 22, 2014 to achieve bowl eligibility. 

Though Arkansas lost its remaining conference game against Missouri, they still achieved a Texas Bowl victory in the postseason, defeating Texas 31–7.

2015 Season
In Bielema's third season, the Razorbacks got off to a slow start, losing to Toledo and Texas Tech and starting 2–4. 

The Hogs then caught fire in the second half of the season, going 5–1 over the final six games, with the only loss coming to Mississippi State on a blocked field goal. Arkansas ended the year by beating Kansas State 45–23 in the Liberty Bowl, to finish the season with a record of 8–5.

2016 Season
Bielema's fourth season was a topsy-turvy 7–6 campaign that ended with two embarrassing defeats at the hands of Missouri in the regular season finale and Virginia Tech in the Belk Bowl. 

The former saw his team blow a 17–point halftime lead and the latter was a 24–point blown halftime lead, the largest for Arkansas since at least 1952.

2017 Season
Following the 2016 season, Bielema hired Central Michigan head coach Dan Enos as the team's offensive coordinator. 

The Hogs went downhill in their 2017 season, finishing 4–8.

Fired
Bielema was fired minutes after concluding his fifth season with a 45–48 loss to Missouri on November 24, 2017.

Chad Morris era (2018–2019)

After Bielema's firing, Arkansas initially pursued Auburn head coach and former Razorbacks offensive coordinator Gus Malzahn with a lucrative contract offer to become the Razorbacks head coach, but Malzahn opted to remain at Auburn and signed an extension with the Tigers. 

On December 6, 2017, SMU head coach Chad Morris was formally introduced as the 34th head coach of the Arkansas Razorbacks. 

Prior to turning around a dismal SMU program in his three years as head coach, Morris solidified himself as one of the nation's best offensive minds during his stint as offensive coordinator at Clemson under Dabo Swinney, instituting a fast-paced spread offense that set school records. 

The University of Arkansas administration signed Morris to a six-year contract worth $3.5 million annually.

2018 Season
In 2018, the Razorbacks finished last in the SEC conference with a 0-8 standing and 2-10 overall win-loss record.

2019 Season
In 2019, Coach Morris failed to improve upon Arkansas' disappointing 2018 result. Once again, the Hogs wound up last in the SEC with a 0-8 conference record and another 2-10 overall standing.

Fired
Chad Morris was fired on November 10, 2019, concluding his tenure with a 4–18 (0–14 in the SEC) record.

Sam Pittman era (2020–present)
On December 8, 2019, Georgia's offensive line and associate head coach Sam Pittman was announced as the new head coach for the University of Arkansas. It was his first head coaching job.

2020 Season
On October 3, 2020, he led the Razorbacks to their first SEC win since they beat Ole Miss in 2017. The Razorbacks finished the season with a 3–7 record in an all SEC schedule due to the COVID-19 pandemic. 

Arkansas was invited to play in the Mercari Texas Bowl against Texas Christian University. However, due to COVID-19 issues on TCU, the game was canceled.

2021 Season
In Pittman's 2021 season, he coached the Razorbacks to a 9–4 record and a 24–10 victory over the Penn State Nittany Lions in the 2022 Outback Bowl in Tampa, Florida on New Year's Day. 

The season included victories over the Texas Longhorns (Arkansas' first win over Texas in Fayetteville since 1981), the Texas A&M Aggies (which ended a 9-game losing streak to A&M), the LSU Tigers and the Missouri Tigers (ending 5-game losing streaks to both schools). 

The wins over Texas A&M, LSU, and Missouri also meant Arkansas was in possession of all three rivalry trophies (Southwest Classic Trophy, Golden Boot Trophy, Battle Line Rivalry Trophy) in the same season. Pittman was named the 2021 AFCA Region 2 Coach of the Year.

2022 Season
Coach Pittman's team started off strong in 2022 and eventually reached #10 in the polls before losing a close contest to Texas A&M when the ball doinked out of the goal after a field goal attempt. 

They would then lose in consecutive weeks to #2 Alabama 49-26 and #23 Mississippi State 40-17. They rebounded by defeating BYU and Auburn on the road, but suffered close home losses to Liberty and rival #7 LSU. 

In the Liberty game, they did not get the potential game-tying two-point conversion due to KJ Jefferson's knee being down before he reached the endzone. They beat #14 Ole Miss 42-27 the following week and achieved bowl eligibility heading into their rivalry game with Missouri.  

The team would successfully defeat the Kansas Jayhawks 55-53 in the 2022 Liberty Bowl.

Conference affiliations 
Arkansas has been affiliated with the following conferences.
 Independent (1894–1914)
 Southwest Conference (1915–1991)
 Southeastern Conference (1992–present)

Championships

National championships 
Arkansas has been named national champion twice by NCAA-designated major selectors. Arkansas claims the 1964 championship but does not claim the co-national championship the program was awarded in 1977 by the Rothman (FACT) poll after the Razorbacks finished the season with an 11–1 record and defeated #2 Oklahoma in the Orange Bowl, 31–6.

In 1964, the Razorbacks finished the season as the only major team with an undefeated and untied record (11–0) after No. 1 Alabama lost to Texas in the Orange Bowl (and after Arkansas previously defeated Texas in Austin, TX that season). However, the AP and Coaches Polls became final before the bowl games were played, leaving one-loss Alabama as the AP and UPI national champion. The Football Writers Association of America (FWAA) and Helms Athletic Foundation (Helms) conducted their final polling after the bowl games and selected Arkansas as the national champion.

Conference championships 
Arkansas has won 13 conference championships, all during their tenure in the Southwest Conference.

† Co-champions

Division championships 
Arkansas has won four division championships, all within the SEC Western Division.  Arkansas has made three appearances in the SEC Championship Game as winner of the SEC Western Division but are 0–3 in those appearances. Arkansas was also the SEC Western Division co-champions in 1998 with Mississippi State but lost to the Bulldogs during the regular season, resulting in Mississippi State representing the West in the SEC Championship Game.  In 2002, Alabama had the best conference record in the West with a 6–2 mark, but was on probation by the NCAA and was barred from post season play. Arkansas played in the SEC Championship Game due to winning the tiebreaker for a three-way tie with Auburn and LSU, both of whom Arkansas defeated during the regular season.

† - Co-champions

Head coaches 

There have been 36 head coaches of Arkansas. Barry Lunney Jr. became the interim head coach on November 11, 2019, after the firing of Chad Morris.

† Interim head coach

Bowl games 
The Razorbacks have appeared in 44 bowl games with an overall record of 17–24–3.

Arkansas has been invited to multiple Cotton Bowl Classics (12 games, 4-7-1 record), Sugar Bowls (6 games, 1-5 record), and Liberty Bowls (6 games, 3-3 record). Arkansas has faced current or future fellow SEC members in multiple bowl games as follows: Georgia (4 times); Oklahoma (3 times); and Alabama, LSU, Ole Miss, Missouri, Tennessee, Texas (2 times each). Arkansas has faced current or future out of conference opponents Georgia Tech, Kansas State, North Carolina, and UCLA in two bowl games each.

Rivalries

Ole Miss 

The Razorbacks first played the Rebels in 1908. In addition to several occasional years of playing each other, the two teams played each other from 1940 to 1947 and 1952–62 on an annual basis. The Razorbacks and Rebels also met twice in the Sugar Bowl, played in New Orleans, in 1963 and 1970 (both won by Ole Miss). Since 1981, the two teams have played each other annually in football. In 2001, Arkansas and Ole Miss played an NCAA record seven-overtime game in Oxford, Mississippi; the amount of overtimes has since been tied, but has not yet been beaten (Arkansas won by a final score of 58–56). When Houston Nutt resigned in 2007 after ten years as Arkansas' head coach to take the same job at Ole Miss, it only added to and heightened the long-standing rivalry between the schools. Nutt was at Ole Miss for four years and went 2-2 versus Arkansas. Arkansas had played Ole Miss more total times than any other SEC opponent until Texas A&M joined the conference in 2012. Arkansas leads the series, 37-29-1, per its records, but only leads 36-30-1 per Ole Miss.

LSU 

Since joining the Southeastern Conference in 1992, the Razorbacks have developed a rivalry with the LSU Tigers. The game was played annually the day after Thanksgiving and was televised on CBS until 2014 when LSU played Texas A&M on Thanksgiving and Arkansas played Missouri that week. The winner of the game has taken home the "Golden Boot", which is a 24-karat gold trophy in the shape of the two states, since its creation in 1996.

In 2002, the rivalry gained some momentum as the game winner would represent the Western Division in the SEC Championship Game. The game (called "Miracle on Markham") was won by Arkansas on a last second touchdown pass by Matt Jones. In 2006, the Tigers snapped the SEC West champion Razorbacks' 10-game winning streak when they beat Arkansas in Little Rock, 31–26. In 2007, Arkansas stunned top-ranked LSU in triple overtime, 50–48, giving them their first win in Baton Rouge since 1993, and their first victory over a top-ranked team since beating Texas in 1981, winning back the Golden Boot trophy (after 4 consecutive seasons in the hands of LSU) in the process. In 2008, the Razorbacks defended the trophy, winning 31–30 on a last minute touchdown drive. As of 2022, after LSU beat Arkansas 13–10, LSU leads the series 43–23–2.

Texas 

The Arkansas-Texas game has not been regularly played since Arkansas's departure from the Southwest Conference in 1991, and this has dulled the intensity of the rivalry.  There were many classic games, including the result of the 1969 Game of the Century (also known as "The Big Shootout"), which eventually led to the Longhorns' 1969 national championship. One of Arkansas' biggest victories over Texas came in 1981, when the Razorbacks defeated the No. 1 ranked Longhorns in Fayetteville, 42–11. Arkansas and Texas have played only six times since 1991, with the Razorbacks winning the 2000 Cotton Bowl, a 2003 game in Austin, and the 2014 Texas Bowl. The Longhorns won the 2004 meeting in Fayetteville and a game in Austin in 2008. However, these games have not served to reignite the once intense rivalry between the two schools. The teams played again in Fayetteville in 2021 (a return game for the 2008 contest in Austin), where the game ended with the Arkansas Razorbacks winning by a score of 40–21; this victory put them in the AP Poll for the first time in 5 years. As of the end of the 2021 season, Texas leads the series 56–23.

Texas A&M 

The Razorbacks first played the Texas A&M Aggies in 1903. From 1934 to 1991, the two had played annually as Southwest Conference members. However, the series ceased in 1991 when Arkansas left the SWC to join the Southeastern Conference. Two of the biggest victories for Arkansas over A&M came in 1975 and 1986. Arkansas manhandled undefeated #2 Texas A&M 31-6 in Little Rock in 1975 to win a share of that year's SWC championship and earn the right to play in the 1976 Cotton Bowl Classic. In 1986, Arkansas again beat Texas A&M in Little Rock, this time 14-10, handing the #7 Aggies their only conference loss of the season. 

The series resumed in 2009 played at AT&T Stadium in Arlington, TX, a neutral field, with Arkansas winning 47–19. The initial agreement between the two schools allowed the game to be played for at least 10 years, followed by 5 consecutive, 4-year rollover options, allowing the game to be played for a total of 30 consecutive seasons.
Following A&M's move to the SEC, the 2012 game was played at Kyle Field, and the 2013 game was played at Arkansas, and thereafter resumed at AT&T Stadium in Arlington, Texas. Beginning in the 2025 season, the series will move back to each team's home-field stadiums.

Arkansas' 20–10 victory during the 2021 season broke a 9-game A&M win streak against Arkansas, but the Aggies won the 2022 matchup 23-21. As of the end of the 2022 season, the Razorbacks lead the all-time series 42–34–3.

Missouri 

Arkansas and Missouri first met in 1906 in Columbia, Missouri, and played each other a total of five times prior to Missouri joining the SEC in 2012, and then becoming Arkansas' permanent cross-division rival in 2014. The annual meeting was dubbed the Battle Line Rivalry by the SEC. On November 23, 2015, a new rivalry trophy was unveiled for the annual game. Missouri leads the series 10-4 as of the conclusion of the 2022 season.

All-time records vs. SEC teams
Records as of December 29, 2022

Awards and honors

Player awards 
Burlsworth Trophy
Grant Morgan - 2021
Jet Award
 Joe Adams - 2011
John Mackey Award
D.J. Williams – 2010
Hunter Henry – 2015
Doak Walker Award
Darren McFadden – 2006, 2007
Walter Camp Award
Darren McFadden – 2007
Dave Rimington Trophy
Jonathan Luigs – 2007
Outland Trophy
William "Bud" Brooks – 1954
Loyd Phillips – 1966

Coaching awards 
AFCA Coach of the Year Award
Frank Broyles - 1964
Sporting News College Football Coach of the Year
Frank Broyles - 1964
Southwest Conference Coach of the Year
Frank Broyles - 1964
Ken Hatfield - 1988
Walter Camp Coach of the Year
Lou Holtz – 1977
Eddie Robinson Coach of the Year
Lou Holtz – 1977
 Football News Division I-A National Coach of the Year
Houston Nutt – 1998
SEC Coach of the Year
Houston Nutt – 2001, 2006

All-Americans 

Every year, players are selected by several publications to be placed on their All-American team for that season. The NCAA officially recognizes five All-American lists which include AP (Associated Press), American Football Coaches Association (AFCA), Football Writers Association of America (FWAA), Sporting News (TSN), and the Walter Camp Football Foundation (WCFF). A consensus All-American is determined using a point system; three points if the player was selected for the first team, two points for the second team, and one point for the third team. Arkansas has had 58 All-Americans (21 consensus) in its history.

† Consensus All-American

Facilities

Donald W. Reynolds Razorback Stadium 

Donald W. Reynolds Razorback Stadium (formerly Razorback Stadium) is the on-campus and primary home stadium for the Razorbacks located in Fayetteville, Arkansas. The Razorbacks began playing football at Razorback Stadium in 1938, where they beat Oklahoma A&M 27–7. The stadium was dedicated to Donald W. Reynolds for the $20 million donation from the Donald W. Reynolds Foundation to help finance the major expansion in 2001, which raised the seating capacity from 51,000 to 76,000. The playing field was dedicated to former head coach and athletic director Frank Broyles in 2007 and is now called the Frank Broyles Field at Donald W. Reynolds Razorback Stadium.

War Memorial Stadium 

War Memorial Stadium is the secondary home stadium for the Razorbacks. War Memorial Stadium is located in Little Rock, Arkansas, with a seating capacity of 53,727. War Memorial Stadium used to host either two or three Razorback football games per season. Beginning in 2014, Arkansas will only play one home game per season in Little Rock.

Willard and Pat Walker Pavilion 
The Willard and Pat Walker Pavilion was built in 1998 and is the indoor practice facility for the Arkansas Razorbacks.

Hall of Fame

College Football Hall of Fame 

Arkansas has 15 inductees to the College Football Hall of Fame with ties to the school.

Pro Football Hall of Fame 

Arkansas has five inductees to the Pro Football Hall of Fame as of 2020.

Future opponents

Non-division opponents 
Arkansas plays Missouri as a permanent non-division opponent annually and rotates around the East division among the other six schools.

Non-conference opponents 
Announced schedules as of August 10, 2021.
No games have been scheduled in the 2030-2031 seasons as of August 10, 2021.

References

External links 

 

 
American football teams established in 1894
1894 establishments in Arkansas